Denyi Reyes (born November 2, 1996) is a Dominican professional baseball pitcher in the New York Mets organization.

Professional career

Boston Red Sox
Reyes signed with the Boston Red Sox as an international free agent on July 2, 2014. He made his professional debut in 2015 with the Dominican Summer League Red Sox, compiling a 7–1 record with 2.88 ERA in 15 games. In 2016, Reyes played for the rookie level Gulf Coast League Red Sox, appearing in nine games with a 4–1 record and 2.34 ERA. With the Class A Short Season Lowell Spinners in 2017, he had a 9–0 record with 1.45 ERA in 15 games. In 2018, Reyes played for both the Class A Greenville Drive and the Class A-Advanced Salem Red Sox; in a total of 27 games (24 starts), he recorded a 1.97 ERA and a 12–5 record.
 
The Red Sox added Reyes to their 40-man roster after the 2018 season. He spent the 2019 season with the Double-A Portland Sea Dogs, compiling an 8–12 record in 26 starts with 4.16 ERA and 116 strikeouts in  innings. On January 28, 2020, Reyes was designated for assignment by the Red Sox, to make room on the 40-man roster for Mitch Moreland. Reyes was sent outright to the Triple-A Pawtucket Red Sox on February 3. He was later announced as a non-roster invitee to Red Sox spring training, but did not play during 2020 due to cancellation of the minor league season. Reyes began the 2021 season in Double-A with Portland. He became a free agent following the season.

Baltimore Orioles
On November 29, 2021, Reyes signed a minor league deal with the Baltimore Orioles. He was assigned to the Triple-A Norfolk Tides to begin the 2022 season.

On May 12, 2022, Reyes was selected to the 40-man roster and promoted to the major leagues for the first time. He was designated for assignment on August 31, 2022. On October 14, Reyes elected to become a free agent.

New York Mets
On November 23, 2022, Reyes signed a minor league deal with the New York Mets with an invite to spring training.

International career
Reyes was named to the Dominican Republic national baseball team for Baseball at the 2020 Summer Olympics, contested in Tokyo in 2021.

See also
 List of Major League Baseball players from the Dominican Republic

References

External links

1996 births
Living people
Baltimore Orioles players
Baseball players at the 2020 Summer Olympics
Delmarva Shorebirds players
Dominican Republic expatriate baseball players in the United States
Dominican Republic national baseball team players
Dominican Summer League Red Sox players
Greenville Drive players
Gulf Coast Red Sox players
Leones del Escogido players
Lowell Spinners players
Major League Baseball pitchers
Major League Baseball players from the Dominican Republic
Medalists at the 2020 Summer Olympics
Norfolk Tides players
Olympic baseball players of the Dominican Republic
Olympic bronze medalists for the Dominican Republic
Olympic medalists in baseball
People from San Cristóbal, Dominican Republic
Portland Sea Dogs players
Salem Red Sox players